CIGI can refer to:
 Carrabba's Italian Grill Inc., a chain of over 200 Italian-style restaurants in the USA
 Centre for International Governance Innovation
 Common Image Generator Interface
 Consolidated Industrial Gases, Inc., a member of the Linde Group, the leading industrial gas company in the Philippines.